En Vivo!!! En la Cárcel de Santa Martha (Live!!! in the Santa Martha Jail) (1989) is the fifth album by the Mexican rock and blues band El Tri. The album is the first one recorded live with this incarnation of the band and the second one along with seventh album Three Souls in My Mind (also recorded at a jail).

Track listing 
All tracks by Alex Lora

 "Introduction" - 0:47
 "Dialogue" - 0:14
 "Caseta de cobro" (Toll Booth) - 5:01 (Es lo Mejor, 1974)
 "Presta" (Lend) - 3:34 (Qué Rico Diablo, 1977)
 "Cuando estoy con mis cuates" (When I Am With My Pals) - 4:14 (Es lo Mejor, 1974)
 "Apriétame" (Squeeze me) - 6:00 (Three Souls in My Mind III, 1972)
 "Mente rockera" (Rocking Mind) - 6:29 (La Devaluación, 1975)
 "Dialogue" - 0:16
 "Pobres de los niños" (Poor Kids) - 3:25 (Bellas de Noche, 1979)
 "Dialogue" - 0:20
 "A.D.O." - 6:10 (Es lo Mejor, 1974)
 "Dialogue" - 0:36
 "El niño sin amor" (Kid Without Love) - 2:25 (El Niño Sin Amor, 1986)
 "Otra oportunidad" (Another Chance) - 3:46 (D'Mentes, 1980)
 "Seguro de vida" (Life Insurance) - 5:52 (Otra Tocada Mas, 1988)
 "Dialogue" - 0:10
 "Santa Martha" - 8:19
 "Encore/Dialogue" - 1:37
 "Triste canción" (Sad Song) - 14:23 (Simplemente, 1984)
 "Renuncio" (I Quit) (Viejas Rolas de Rock, 1981)
 "Dialogue"
 "Oye Cantinero" (Hey, Bartender) (Three Souls in My Mind III, 1972)

Album and year of original release inside parenthesis

Personnel 

 Alex Lora – guitar, vocals
 Rafael Salgado – harmonic
 Sergio Mancera – electric & rhythm guitar
 Pedro Martínez – drums
 Ruben Soriano – bass

External links
www.eltri.com.mx
En Vivo!!! En la Cárcel de Santa Martha  at Musicbrainz
[ En Vivo!!! En la Cárcel de Santa Martha ] at Allmusic
En Vivo!!! En la Cárcel de Santa Martha  at Discogs

El Tri live albums
1989 live albums
Warner Music Group live albums